Andrew Parkinson may refer to:

Andrew Parkinson (basketball) (born 1967), Australian basketball player
Andrew Parkinson (soccer) (born 1959), South African-American soccer player
Andrew Parkinson (artist) (born 1959), English artist
Andy Parkinson (born 1979), English footballer